Acharya Jagadish Chandra Bose Road (earlier known as Lower Circular Road) and its continuation northwards called Acharya Prafulla Chandra Road (earlier known as Upper Circular Road), are together the longest and the most important north-south thoroughfare in Kolkata, India.

History 

The road came upon the stretch that formed the Maratha Ditch that was dug in 1742 to protect the City from the Bargi invasions. In 1799 the ditch was filled up and the current outline of the road built. Until the 1870s, the Circular Road was considered the de facto eastern boundary of the City of Calcutta as the suburbs to its east, i.e. Manicktala, Rajabazar, Narikeldanga, Ultadanga, and Beliaghata were still semi-urban semi-rural villages.

Legacy 
Named after the renowned chemist Acharya Prafulla Chandra Roy and the renowned physicist and botanist Acharya Jagadish Chandra Bose.

Stretch and description 
APC Road and AJC Bose Road taken together is the longest road in Kolkata. APC Road emerges from the Shyambazar Five-Point Crossing (Paanch Mathar More). It then passes through Khanna Crossing, Beadon Street Crossing, Maniktala Crossing, Rajabazar Crossing, M. G. Road Crossing, Vidyapati Flyover and ends at Sealdah Station.

From Sealdah Station, it is known as AJC Bose Road, which passes through Lenin Sarani Crossing (Moulali Crossing), S. N. Banerjee Road Crossing, Ripon Street Crossing, Elliot Road Crossing, Park Street Crossing (Mullick Bazar), Shakespeare Sarani Crossing, Circus Avenue Crossing (Beck Bagan), Ballygunge Circular Road Crossing, Lansdowne Crossing (Minto Park), Camac Street Crossing, Lee Road Crossing, Chowringhee Crossing or Exide Crossing, Cathedral Road Crossing (Nandan and Rabindra Sadan on one side), Victoria Memorial-Hospital Road/Debendra Lal Khan Road Crossing, Alipore Road Crossing, Kolkata Race Course on one side and finishes its journey at Strand Road-Hastings Crossing. From the Point of Circus Avenue Crossing till the Victoria Memorial, the road runs below the "AJC Bose Road Flyover", which is the 2nd longest flyover and busiest flyover in the city at 2.9 km long, connecting Park Circus to Victoria Memorial on one branch, and serving as the direct flyover connection onto Parama Island Flyover on the other branch. After both ramps of the flyover connecting it with Parama Island Flyover were completed in early 2019, the flyover forms a seamless, no-signal traffic corridor known as Maa flyover from  PG Hospital to EM Bypass.

Landmarks 
 Shyambazar, Five-Point Crossing
 Khanna Cinema
 Bangiya Sahitya Parishad
 Central Blood Bank
 Rammohan Library
 Bose Institute
 Calcuta Deaf School
 Rajabazar Science College
 Dr. M N Chatterjee Eye Hospital & Ayurvedic College and Hospital
 Victoria Institution
 Sealdah ESI Hospital
 Vidyapati Flyover
 Sealdah Station
 Nil Ratan Sircar Medical College and Hospital
 Dr. R. Ahmed Dental College and Hospital
 Mother Teresa's Shishu Bhavan
 St James' School
 Pratt Memorial school- one of the oldest schools of Kolkata
 Mother House, Missionaries of Charity
 Lower Circular Road cemetery 
 Institute of Neurosciences Kolkata
 Tulip Inn Hotel
 La Martiniere School for boys and girls
 Minto Park (Shaheed Bhagat Singh Udyan)
 Hotel Hindustan International 
 St Joseph's Home
 Acharya Jagadish Chandra Bose College
 Nehru Children's Museum
 The Calcutta Club
 Nandan
 Rabindra Sadan
 Kolkata Race Course
 SSKM Hospital
 Dr. B. C. Roy Post Graduate Institute of Basic Medical Sciences
The Frank Anthony Public School, Kolkata

Gallery

References

External links
 The sounds of A.J.C. Bose Road in Kolkata. The size of audio file is 3 Mb.

Roads in Kolkata